Théo Herckenrath (22 July 1911 – 20 March 1973) was a Belgian racing cyclist. He won the 1934 edition of the Liège–Bastogne–Liège.

References

External links

1911 births
1973 deaths
Belgian male cyclists
Sportspeople from Aalst, Belgium
Cyclists from East Flanders